Ina Sizer Cassidy was an American writer, sculptor, suffragist, teacher and lecturer.

Biography
Ina was born Perlina Sizer in 1869 on a cattle ranch near present-day Las Animas, Colorado. Her parents were Eber Rockwell Sizer and Mary Savage Sizer. Ina attended Columbia University, and became involved in the suffrage movement in New York. She met artist Gerald Cassidy in Denver, Colorado and the two were married in 1912.

The Cassidys moved to Santa Fe, New Mexico soon after marrying and became part of the burgeoning colony of artists and writers. From 1931 to 1960 Ina wrote a monthly column in New Mexico Magazine called "Art and Artists." Ina exhibited her sculptures at the Museum of New Mexico in Santa Fe from 1928-1954, and in Albuquerque at the New Mexico State Fair from 1930-1953. She served as the New Mexico Director of the Federal Writer's Project from 1935-1939, a job she secured after John Collier recommended her appointment. She was active in numerous civic and cultural organizations including the American Indian Defense Association, New Mexico Association on Indian Affairs, the Spanish Colonial Arts Society, the Historical Society of New Mexico, National League of American Pen Women, the Daughters of the American Revolution and Mayflower Society, and was President of the New Mexico Folklore Society. She became a charter member of the National League of Women Voters in New Mexico.

Cassidy died in 1965. She was cremated and her ashes are buried next to her late husband in Fairview Cemetery in Santa Fe, New Mexico.

References

1869 births
1965 deaths
American women writers
American suffragists
American women sculptors
People from Bent County, Colorado
Columbia University alumni